was a Japanese artist who specialized in kappazuri stencil prints. He was for many years a member of the mingei folk craft movement, and was close with Yanagi Sōetsu, founder of the movement, and Serizawa Keisuke, among others, producing stencil-dyed textiles and other textiles arts before turning to prints later in his career.

Yoshitoshi is said to have influenced several major 20th century print artists, including Shikō Munakata and Hiromitsu Takahashi.

His colorful works generally depict scenes from the kabuki theatre, or subjects related to folk traditions and festivals. Art collector Ren Brown writes that Yoshitoshi's "figures are most often rendered with a simplicity that manages to denote great energy and movement. ... Mori is known for using earthy colors in his work, and for often positioning his figures in a somewhat contorted and dynamic mass."

Life and career
Yoshitoshi was born in Tokyo in 1898. He studied art at the Kawabata School of Fine Arts, and worked primarily in textile arts for many years. It was during this time that he met and worked with Serizawa Keisuke and Yanagi Sōetsu, studying stencil-dyeing techniques and becoming involved in the mingei movement.

It was not until the 1950s that Yoshitoshi began creating works on paper, quickly becoming known as one of the key artists of the sōsaku hanga movement. He was criticized by Yanagi Sōetsu in a major debate in 1962, who accused Yoshitoshi of abandoning the mingei movement, after which he distanced himself from the movement even more so, and began to focus more exclusively on kappazuri stencil prints.

Yoshitoshi exhibited his works in numerous one-man shows in Japan in the 1960s, and took part in thirty international exhibitions between 1957 and 1977. He was awarded an honorary doctorate by Maryland University in 1984, and was formally honored by the Tokyo Metropolitan Government. He died on May 29, 1992, immediately following the end of what would be his final one-man gallery show, held at the Wako Gallery Tokyo.

Collections 
His work is held in several museums worldwide, including the British Museum, the Seattle Art Museum, the Brooklyn Museum, the University of Michigan Museum of Art, the Jordan Schnitzer Museum of Art, the Minneapolis Institute of Art, the Los Angeles County Museum of Art, the Harvard Art Museums, the Fine Arts Museums of San Francisco, the Museum of Fine Arts, Boston, the Birmingham Museum of Art, the Museum of Modern Art, Kamakura & Hayama, the Weatherspoon Art Museum, the Portland Art Museum, and the Metropolitan Museum of Art.

References
 Michener, James A., The Modern Japanese Print: An Appreciation, Tuttle Publishing, Rutland, Vermont, 1968, pp. 23-26

Footnotes

1898 births
1992 deaths
Japanese printmakers
Sosaku hanga artists
20th-century Japanese artists
20th-century printmakers
Artists from Tokyo